Lentomitella is a genus of fungus in the family Xenospadicoidaceae.

Species 
The following species are accepted within Lentomitella:

 Lentomitella cirrhosa
 Lentomitella conoidea
 Lentomitella crinigera
 Lentomitella investita
 Lentomitella magna
 Lentomitella obscura
 Lentomitella pallibrunnea
 Lentomitella striatella
 Lentomitella sulcata
 Lentomitella tenuirostris
 Lentomitella tomentosa
 Lentomitella tropica
 Lentomitella unipretoriae
 Lentomitella vestita

References

Further reading 
 

Sordariomycetes genera